|}

The Lockinge Stakes is a Group 1 flat horse race in Great Britain open to horses aged four years or older. It is run over a distance of 1 mile (1,609 metres) at Newbury in May.

History
The event is named after Lockinge, a civil parish located to the north of Newbury. It was established in 1958, and originally open to horses aged three or older. The first edition was won by that year's 2000 Guineas Stakes winner Pall Mall. The horse repeated his success as a four-year-old in 1959.

The present race grading system was introduced in 1971, and the Lockinge Stakes was given Group 2 status. It was abandoned due to torrential rain in 1975.

The event was relegated to Group 3 level in 1983, and promoted back to Group 2 in 1985. It was raised to Group 1 and closed to three-year-olds in 1995.

The Lockinge Stakes became part of the British Champions Series in 2011. It is currently the second race in the mile division, which concludes with the Queen Elizabeth II Stakes in October.

The leading horses from the Lockinge Stakes often go on to compete in the Queen Anne Stakes. The last to win both races in the same year was Frankel in 2012.

Records
Most successful horse (2 wins):
 Pall Mall – 1958, 1959
 Welsh Pageant – 1970, 1971
 Soviet Line – 1995, 1996

Leading jockey (6 wins):
 Lester Piggott – Sovereign Path (1960), The Creditor (1964), Sparkler (1973), Belmont Bay (1981), Polar Falcon (1991), Swing Low (1993)

Leading trainer (8 wins):
 Sir Michael Stoute – Scottish Reel (1986), Safawan (1990), Soviet Line (1995, 1996), Medicean (2001), Russian Rhythm (2004), Peeress (2006), Mustashry (2019)

Leading owner (8 wins):

 Godolphin – Cape Cross (1998), Fly to the Stars (1999), Aljabr (2000), Creachadoir (2008), Farhh (2013), Night of Thunder (2015), Belardo (2016), Ribchester (2017)

Winners

See also
 Horse racing in Great Britain
 List of British flat horse races

References

 Paris-Turf:
 Racing Post:
 galopp-sieger.de – Lockinge Stakes.
 ifhaonline.org – International Federation of Horseracing Authorities – Lockinge Stakes (2019).
 pedigreequery.com – Lockinge Stakes – Newbury.
 

Open mile category horse races
Newbury Racecourse
Flat races in Great Britain
1958 establishments in England
Recurring sporting events established in 1958
British Champions Series